The Liberian Constitution of 1847 was the first constitution of the Republic of Liberia. Largely modeled on the Constitution of the United States, it remained in effect from its adoption on 26 July 1847 until its suspension by the People's Redemption Council, following the coup d'état on 12 April 1980.

Provisions
The Constitution created a unitary state governed by three branches of government: the executive, legislative and judicial branches. The executive branch was led by the President, elected by popular vote of all land-owning citizens to a two-year term. Legislative power was held by the Legislature, a bicameral body made up of a House of Representatives and a Senate. The judicial branch consisted of the Supreme Court, made up of the Chief Justice and four associate justices, and circuit courts created by the Legislature. Article One of the Constitution enshrined civil liberties similar to those protected by the Bill of Rights in the United States Constitution.

Approved in a referendum on 27 September 1847, the Constitution was amended several times from 1847 to 1980. Among these amendments, the term length of the president was extended to four years in 1907, and to eight years in 1935.

See also
 Constitution of Liberia

External links
 

1847 in law
1847 in Liberia
Liberia, 1847
Politics of Liberia
Law of Liberia
1847 documents